The Bastiat Prize was a journalism award given annually by the Reason Foundation. In 2011 and before it was given by the International Policy Network. The Bastiat Prize recognized journalists whose published works "explain, promote and defend the principles of the free society." The award came with US$15,000.

Instituted in 2002, the Prize was inspired by the 19th-century French philosopher Frédéric Bastiat and his defense of liberty. Bastiat's use of satire and allegory enabled him to relate complex economic issues to a general audience. In keeping with his legacy, Bastiat Prize entries were judged on intellectual content, the persuasiveness of the language used, and the type of publication in which they appeared

Judges included Margaret Thatcher, James Buchanan, and Milton Friedman.

Prize winners
 2002: Sauvik Chakraverti and Amity Shlaes.
 2003: Brian Carney.
 2004: Robert Guest.
 2005: Mary Anastasia O'Grady.
 2006: Tim Harford and Jamie Whyte.
 2007: Amit Varma
 2008: Barton Hinkle.
 2009: John Hasnas, Shikha Dalmia, and Daniel Hannan
 2010: James Delingpole and Bret Stephens
 2011: Tom Easton and Virginia Postrel
 2012: Anne Jolis
 2013: Lane Filler and Ross Clark
 2014: Robert Graboyes
 2015: Amit Varma
 2016: Tim Harford
 2017: Radley Balko and Hugo Restall
 2018: Bari Weiss

References

External links
 Bastiat Prize Policy Network 2011 and prior
 Bastiat Prize Reason Foundation 2012

Bastiat Prize
Bastiat Prize
2002 establishments in the United States